The Walking Target is a 1960 crime film directed by Edward L. Cahn and starring Joan Evans, Merry Anders, and Ronald Foster. The screenplay concerns an ex-con who, upon release from prison, sets out to retrieve the $260,000 he hid before he was arrested, and  finds unexpected romance with the widow of his former partner in crime.

Plot
As Nick Harbin is about to be released from prison after five years, he refuses to tell the prison governor where he stashed the $260,000 he stole in a payroll heist which left his two accomplices dead. On the outside, it's clear nobody will let that amount of money disappear, as he is met right away by reporters, police, and his old girlfriend Sue, who acts keen to take up with Nick again.

Nick and Sue drive out to Nick's old house (tailed by the police) where they find Dave, another friend. Both Sue and Dave are a little too keen to find the money, and with "good reason" - they are now a couple, and working for Arnie Hoffman, a local gangster, to get the money.

Nick manages to shake off the cops and find his way to the home of Sammy Russo, one of his deceased partners; Nick's one real love is Sammy's widow Gail. He finds the house empty, but a vagrant living in the old garage guides Nick to a small town in Arizona, where he finds Gail working in her family's restaurant. She isn't happy to see him, but realizes that he changed while in prison, and she slowly warms to him. Nick is tired of the pressure and offers Gail all the money to do with as she wants; he merely wants to live peacefully. They decide to hand it all in to the police in the morning, having retrieved it from inside the frame of Gail's car, where it was stashed after the raid.

When Dave and Hoffman show up with a heavy to force Nick to hand over the money, threatening to beat Gail until he does, the police turn up just in time to save them. Nick tells the police where the money is, and then embraces Gail.

Cast
Joan Evans as Gail Russo
Ronald Foster as Nick Harbin
Merry Anders as Susan
Harp McGuire as Max Brodney
Robert Christopher as Dave
Berry Kroeger as Hoffman
Bill Couch as Thug
Norman Alden as Russo
James Callahan as Al Kramer

References

External links

1960 films
1960s English-language films
American black-and-white films
1960 crime films
Films directed by Edward L. Cahn
Films produced by Edward Small
American crime films
Films scored by Paul Sawtell
1960s American films